Lavagnino is an Italian surname. Notable people with the surname include:

Angelo Francesco Lavagnino (1909–1987), Italian classical composer
Sam Lavagnino (born 2006), American voice actor

Italian-language surnames